Titanic acid is a general name for a family of chemical compounds of the elements titanium, hydrogen, and oxygen, with the general formula . Various simple titanic acids have been claimed, mainly in the older literature. No crystallographic and little spectroscopic support exists for these materials.

Metatitanic acid, 
It is described as a white salt-like powder under "".
Peroxotitanic acid has also been described as resulting from the treatment of titanium dioxide in sulfuric acid with hydrogen peroxide.
Pertitanic acid
Pertitanic acid

References

Further reading

Titanium(IV) compounds
Hydroxides
Transition metal oxoacids

he:חומצה טיטנית
ru:Титанаты